Women’s healthcare in the United States has been constantly evolving to more fully address the needs of women throughout the U.S. During the twentieth century, many policies, practices, and treatments improved in order to better fit the needs of women. Men were often viewed as the appropriate professionals to attend to healthcare needs in the United States, including those of women. This made healthcare in the United States a sexist system. Women holding positions of power within our government as well as some men, would use their political stance to better address the needs of women. Policies were being revoked and new ones were being put in their place; policies that include women from minority groups that face racial prejudice not only from within the workforce but from healthcare institutions as well. In the 1950s into the 1960s, these healthcare institutions had scientists and doctors working on producing contraceptives, despite their controversial public opinions. Feminists within the U.S. were speaking out against the injustices, and inequality women were facing in the twentieth century to bring awareness to the needs of women and ensure that, as a country, the U.S. better address those needs within the twentieth century.

The feminist movement’s effects on women’s healthcare 
As feminist activists became more prevalent in the 20th Century, they challenged disparities in education, employment, and social rights, and improved women's healthcare by eliminating sexism in healthcare. Many circumstances of sexism being apparent revolve around doctors dismissing women's pain or not addressing their pain as seriously as their male counterparts. One influence that pushed women to fight for control over their healthcare rights was 1,200 self-help healthcare groups formed throughout the United States in the 1970s. Many women were thus inspired to practice careers that focused on women’s health. By 1980, 30% of gynecologist residents were women. Even with this achievement for women, males still dominated women's healthcare. Male doctors often would not respond to or address questions or opinions that women, both patients and fellow doctors, had about women’s health. It was not uncommon for a male doctor to misdiagnose a woman in the 1900s. To combat this, women's rights advocates constructed healthcare institutions specifically aimed at ending healthcare sexism.

Women of minority races and their health treatments 
Historically, women of color in the U.S. had to manage sexism as well as racial prejudice. Once the 20th century arrived, women’s health became an important and integral part of the healthcare system within the U.S. Women’s rights activists fought for more women-oriented health centers that could provide primary care for women. Such care involved reproductive care, breast care programs, pregnancy and childbirth care, etc. By 1997, it was calculated that approximately one-third of hospitals had added a healthcare unit specifically catered to the needs of women in the United States. Once such programs were put in place, women of color had to then fight to receive fair and equal care to that of white women.  Many medical experimentations were done on women of color during the 20th century; in third-world countries and parts of U.S., using women of color for medical learning was a common practice and considered socially acceptable to their communities. These inhumane experiments were a reflection of the racism displayed in our history of medical research and practice within the United States. Studies show that in the early 1900s, African-American women had shorter life expectancy than white women (48.7 compared to 33.2 years).

The fight for women’s health insurance 
Healthcare policy was often discriminatory when it came to women in the twentieth century. Often health insurance was not even an option for women as many insurance companies would not approve women to sign their policies. Many women suffered because of their inability to gain health coverage in this time unless they had a supporting male or employer. In turn, they were then subjected to the decisions those men and employers made regarding health insurance. Because women were far less likely to obtain and hold health insurance. These various obstacles society implemented are what deterred many women from fighting for their rights at an earlier time in history.

Women’s reproductive healthcare 

In the early 1900s, topics concerning women's reproductive rights were taboo. By the 1960s, this fight for reproductive rights was known throughout the United States. The reproductive rights issue included the freedom to use birth contraceptives, the freedom and access to legal abortions, and the right to birth their children in environments, and with the method, that they found suitable. One specific example of a method not popular in public opinion in the late 1900s, but had been common in the early 1900s was natural childbirth. Women activists who fought for these reproductive rights were key in the passing of decision by the Supreme Court to legalize abortion in 1973 in the case Roe vs Wade. That court decision was overturned in 2022 in Dobbs v. Jackson Women’s Health Organization.

Birth contraceptives 

Women faced the challenge of freely speaking about and being provided with birth contraceptives. Any kind of talk of contraceptives was more often than not avoided in the early twentieth century as it was a very controversial subject. With the feminist movements came a push for more rights for these preventative methods to become accessible to women. The first birth control in the form of a pill came to market in 1960. Margaret Sanger and Katherine McCormick were two key women in the making and distribution of this form of birth control. Because the distribution was limited in terms of who healthcare facilities would give this pill to, McCormick started a business selling birth control which received an incredible response from about 2.3 million women at the time.

Abortion 
Abortion was another controversial topic during the twentieth century. In the 1960s, it became a topic of heightened awareness in the United States because of a woman named Sherri Finkbine. Finkbine got approval from her oral contraceptives physician to receive an abortion because of a medicine she took, thalidomide, that was known to cause fetal deformities. The hospital denied Finkbine the abortion, so she found approval in Sweden, where she went ahead with the abortion. Making news in the United States, many started to take sides and feminist groups began to push harder for the legality of abortions. By 1973, abortions were legalized but only by the approval of medical practices. Extreme amounts of women went through illegal abortions in the 1960s, and because of this, nearly 1000 women died every year from these illegal abortions.

See also 

 Contraceptive mandate
 Feminist movement
 Abortion-rights movements
 Women's Health Initiative

References

Feminism in the United States
Women's health in the United States